Artur Aristakisyan is an Armenian-Russian film director. He was born in Chişinău (Moldavian SSR, Soviet Union, now Moldova) in 1961.

Filmography
 1994 Ladoni (Palms)
 2001 Mesto na zemle (A Place on Earth)

External links

References

1961 births
Living people
Russian film directors
Film people from Chișinău